Conspiracy Entertainment (formerly Conspiracy Games) is an American third-party developer video game publisher, publishing games from smaller companies that would face difficulties distributing games themselves. The company has also developed a few games of its own.

Games published

Dreamcast
Bangai-O
Record of Lodoss War: Advent of Cardice

Game Boy Advance
An American Tail: Fievel's Gold Rush
Animaniacs: Lights, Camera, Action!
The Flintstones: Big Trouble in Bedrock
Gadget Racers
The Land Before Time
Road Trip: Shifting Gears
Tiny Toon Adventures: Buster's Bad Dream
Tiny Toon Adventures: Wacky Stackers

Game Boy Color
The Land Before Time
Tiny Toon Adventures: Buster Saves the Day
Tom & Jerry: Mouse Hunt
Tom & Jerry in Mouse Attacks

GameCube
Animaniacs: The Great Edgar Hunt
Rally Championship
Road Trip: The Arcade Edition

Nintendo DS
Dragon's Lair
Jeff Corwin Experience
Panzer Tactics DS
Power Play Pool
Witches & Vampires
Virtual Villagers: A New Home

Wii
America's Next Top Model
Anubis II
Billy the Wizard: Rocket Broomstick Racing
Counter Force
Myth Makers: Trixie in Toyland
Myth Makers Super Kart GP
Ninjabread Man
Octomania
Real Heroes: Firefighter
Winter Sports: The Ultimate Challenge
Winter Sports 2: The Next Challenge
Rock 'n' Roll Adventures
Safari Adventures Africa

Microsoft Windows
Enclave
Johnny Rocketfingers 2
Tremors
X10

PlayStation
The Amazing Virtual Sea-Monkeys
Creatures
Rescue Copter
Marble Master
Tiny Toon Adventures: Plucky's Big Adventure

PlayStation 2
Animaniacs: The Great Edgar Hunt
Garfield: Lasagna World Tour
Gadget Racers
Hidden Invasion
Road Trip Adventure
Phantasy Star Trilogy (cancelled)
Seek and Destroy
Sega Classics Collection
Stretch Panic
Tiny Toon Adventures: Defenders of the Universe (cancelled)
Tremors
X10

PlayStation Portable
Dream Models
Jeff Corwin Experience
Pocket Pool
Ultimate Block Party

Xbox 360
Autobahn Polizei
Superbike World Championship
Winter Sports 2

Games developed

PC
Blaze & Blade: Eternal Quest

Game Boy Color
Logical
Magical Drop
Microsoft Puzzle Collection
Tom & Jerry: Mouse Hunt

PlayStation 2
Mix TV Presents: Eminem

References 

Companies based in Long Beach, California
Privately held companies based in California
Video game companies established in 1997
Video game companies of the United States
Video game publishers
American companies established in 1997
1997 establishments in California